Zeelandia may refer to:

 1336 Zeelandia, a main-belt asteroid
 Fort Zeelandia (Guyana), a historical fort in Guyana
 Fort Zeelandia (Paramaribo), a historical fort in Suriname
 Fort Zeelandia (Taiwan) or Fort Anping, a historical fort in Taiwan
 USS Zeelandia (Id. No. 2507), a U.S. Navy troopship
 Zeelandia, Guyana, a village in Guyana

See also
 Zealandia (disambiguation)
 Zeeland (disambiguation)